Samúel Pétursson Thorsteinsson (1 January 1893 – 25 November 1956) was an Icelandic footballer and a physician. He played in seven matches for the Denmark national team in 1918 and 1919.

Playing the right outside forward position, he won the Danish football Championship in 1919 and 1921 as part of Akademisk Boldklub. He also played briefly for the Italian Naples Foot-Ball & Cricket Club, becoming the first Nordic footballer to compete in Italy.

Family
Thorsteinsson was born in Bíldudalur, Iceland, to Icelandic entrepreneur Pétur J. Thorsteinsson and Ásthildur Guðmundsdóttir. He was a younger brother of Icelandic artist Muggur and older brother of footballers Gunnar Thorsteinsson and Friðþjófur Thorsteinsson.

References

External links
 

1893 births
1956 deaths
20th-century Danish physicians
Akademisk Boldklub players
Association football midfielders
Danish men's footballers
Denmark international footballers
Icelandic footballers
People from Lyngby-Taarbæk Municipality
Sportspeople from the Capital Region of Denmark